Shouyi Road Station, is a station of Line 4 of Wuhan Metro. It entered revenue service on December 28, 2014. It is located in Wuchang District.

Station layout

Around the station
 Qiyi Street Mosque

Gallery

References

Wuhan Metro stations
Line 4, Wuhan Metro
Railway stations in China opened in 2014